Teillé may refer to the following places in France:

 Teillé, Loire-Atlantique, a commune in the Loire-Atlantique department
 Teillé, Sarthe, a commune in the Sarthe department